Kotogahama Sadao (Jap 琴ヶ濵貞雄) (10 October 1927 – 7 June 1981) was a sumo wrestler from Kanonji, Kagawa, Japan.

He reached the second highest rank of ōzeki in 1958. He was a tournament runner-up in the top makuuchi division on five occasions and earned seven kinboshi for defeating yokozuna when ranked as a maegashira. After his retirement in 1962 he became an elder in the Japan Sumo Association and worked as a coach at Sadogatake stable. He was offered the chance to take charge of the stable in 1974 but declined, preferring to remain as an assistant coach there until his death in 1981.

Pre-modern top division record
The New Year tournament began and the Spring tournament returned to Osaka in 1953.

Modern top division record
Since the addition of the Kyushu tournament in 1957 and the Nagoya tournament in 1958, the yearly schedule has remained unchanged.

See also
Glossary of sumo terms
List of past sumo wrestlers
List of sumo tournament top division runners-up
List of sumo tournament second division champions
List of ōzeki

References

1927 births
1981 deaths
Japanese sumo wrestlers
Sumo people from Kagawa Prefecture
Ōzeki
Sadogatake stable sumo wrestlers